The abacost, a blending of the French "à bas le costume", was the distinctive clothing for men that was promoted by Mobutu Sese Seko as part of his authenticité programme in Zaire, between 1972 and 1990. Zairians were banned from wearing Western-style suits with shirt and tie to symbolise the break with their colonial past. The abacost was a lightweight suit, worn without a tie, though sometimes with a cravat. It closely resembled a Mao suit. It was seen in long-sleeved and short-sleeved versions.

The abacost was seen as the uniform of Mobutu's supporters, especially those who had benefited from his regime. When Mobutu announced a transition to multiparty democracy in 1990, he said that the Western suit and tie would be allowed, but that he continued to favor the abacost and it would still be considered the national dress. Subsequently, when the transitional government was sworn in, all of the ministers were wearing abacosts.

Arzoni in Zellik, Belgium produced the world's "chicest" abacosts. Alfons Mertens, employed by Arzoni, became Mobutu's personal tailor, also making uniforms for him and his entourage.

The abacost fell out of favour after Mobutu's removal from power.

See also
Kariba suit
Nehru jacket
Madiba shirt

References

External links
Library of Congress; Glossary, Zaire

African clothing
Clothing in politics
African and Black nationalism in Africa
Zaire